Notocrater is a genus of deep-water true limpets, marine gastropod molluscs in the family Pseudococculinidae, one of the families of true limpets.

Several species in this genus have two tentacles on each side of the body situated in the lateral grooves between foot and mantle

Species
Species within the genus Notocrater include:
 Notocrater christofferseni Lima, 2014
 Notocrater craticulatus (Suter, 1908)
 Notocrater gracilis B.A. Marshall, 1986
 Notocrater houbricki McLean & Harasewych, 1995
 † Notocrater maxwelli B. A. Marshall, 1986 
 Notocrater meridionalis (Hedley, 1903)
  Notocrater ponderi B.A. Marshall, 1986
 Notocrater pustulosus (Thiele, 1925)
 Notocrater youngi McLean & Harasewych, 1995
Species brought into synonymy
 Notocrater craticulata (Suter, 1908): synonym of Notocrater craticulatus (Suter, 1908)
 Notocrater minutus (Habe, 1958): synonym of Notocrater pustulosus (Thiele, 1925)

References

 Habe T. (1958). Descriptions of ten new gastropod species. Venus. 20(1): 32-42.
 Marshall B.A. (1986 ["1985"]) Recent and Tertiary Cocculinidae and Pseudococculinidae (Mollusca: Gastropoda) from New Zealand and New South Wales. New Zealand Journal of Zoology 12: 505-546.

Further reading 
 Ardila N. E. & Harasewych M. G. (June 2005). "Cocculinid and pseudococculinid limpets (Gastropoda: Cocculiniformia) from off the Caribbean coast of Colombia". Proceedings of the Biological Society of Washington 118(2): 344-366. .

External links
 Finlay H.J. (1926). A further commentary on New Zealand molluscan systematics. Transactions of the New Zealand Institute. 57: 320-485, pls 18-23

Pseudococculinidae
Gastropods of New Zealand
Taxa named by Harold John Finlay